Kansas City Scout may refer to:

 The Scout (Kansas City, Missouri statue), a statue by Cyrus E. Dallin in Kansas City, Missouri
 Kansas City Scout, a traffic management system 
 Kansas City Scouts, a defunct hockey team in Kansas City that existed between 1974 and 1976
 Kansas City Scouts (NAHL), an NAHL hockey team that never played